Gauri Shankar Khadka is a Nepalese politician, belonging to the Communist Party of Nepal (Maoist). In April 2008, he won the Jhapa-2 seat in the Constituent Assembly election with   	18580 votes.

References

Year of birth missing (living people)
Living people
Communist Party of Nepal (Maoist Centre) politicians
Nepalese atheists

Members of the 1st Nepalese Constituent Assembly